A marathon is a foot race for humans for a distance of .

Marathon also may refer to:

Places

Australia
 Marathon, Queensland

Canada
 Marathon, Ontario

Greece
 Marathon, Greece, after which the distance race was named
Battle of Marathon
Lake Marathon, 8 km west of the town
Marathon Dam, forming the lake

United States
 Marathon, Florida
 Marathon, Iowa
 Marathon Township, Michigan
 Marathon (town), New York
 Marathon (village), New York
 Marathon, Ohio
 Marathon, Texas
 Marathon, Wisconsin, town
 Marathon County, Wisconsin
 Marathon City, Wisconsin

Sports
 Mini marathon
 Half marathon
 Ultramarathon
 Marathon dancing
 Marathon swimming
 Ski marathon
 Ice skating marathon
 Club Deportivo Marathón, a Honduran soccer club
 The Marathon (horse race), a horse race in the United States

Businesses
 Marathon Enterprises, Inc., maker of Sabrett hot dogs
 Marathon Motor Works, producers of the Marathon automobile
 Marathon (automobile), vehicles manufactured by Marathon 1911–1914
 Marathon Oil, a US-based oil and natural gas exploration and production company
 Marathon Petroleum, a US-based oil refining, marketing, and pipeline transport company.
 Marathon Sports, an Ecuadorian-based athletic company that distributes athletic equipment to sports teams
 Automobiles Marathon, a French manufacturer of Panhard powered light sports cars in the 1950s
 Marathon Automated Test Systems, a system for automated testing of printed circuit boards from Computer Automation

Candy 
 Marathon candy bar, a Mars' rival to Curly Wurly in the US from 1973 to 1982
 Snickers candy bar, marketed under the name "Marathon" in the United Kingdom and Ireland until 1990

Entertainment

Film and television 
 Marathon Production, a TV program production and distribution company
 The Marathon (film), a 1919 film starring Harold Lloyd
 Maratón (film), a 1968 Czechoslovak war film directed by Ivo Novák
 Marathon (1980 film), a film starring Dick Gautier.
 Marathon (1988 film), a sport-drama film directed by Terence Young
 Marathon (1992 film), a Spanish film about the Barcelona Olympics directed by Carlos Saura
 Marathon (2005 film), a South Korean film about an autistic marathon runner
 Marathon (media), the sequential broadcast of a number of related media programs
 Marathon Media a French production company and animation studio in Paris
 Movie marathon, viewing of multiple consecutive movies
 "Marathon" (Law & Order), an episode of Law & Order
 "Marathon" (The Flash), an episode of The Flash

Video games
 Marathon Trilogy, a video game series for the Macintosh developed and produced by Bungie in the mid-1990s
 Marathon (video game), the first in the trilogy (1994)
 Marathon 2: Durandal, the second in the trilogy (1995)
 Marathon Infinity, the third in the trilogy (1996)

Music 
 Dance Marathon, a type of multi-day charity event, popular in the US in the 1920s and 1930s
 Maratone Studios, a music production company based in Sweden
 Sgt. Peppercorn's Marathon, an annual live concert of all of the music of The Beatles
 The Vibrations, an R&B group whose alter ego was "The Marathons"

Albums 
 The Marathon (mixtape), by American rapper Nispey Hussle
 Marathon (Saga album)
 Marathon (Santana album), by Carlos Santana
 Maraton (album), by Swedish singer Alina Devecerski

Songs 
 "Marathon" (Rush song), from the album Power Windows
 "Marathon", by Tennis from the album Cape Dory
 "Marathon", by Kayo Dot from the album Choirs of the Eye
 "Marathon", by Dilated Peoples  from the album Neighborhood Watch
 "Marathon", a song by Helene Fischer on the 2013 album Farbenspiel

Vehicles
 Checker Marathon, an automobile model from Checker Motors Company 
 Aircraft:
 Handley Page Marathon, British four-engined light transport 
 Heldeberg Marathon, American design for powered parachute  
 Mirage Marathon, American home-built aircraft design

Other uses 
 A typeface created by Rudolf Koch
 A container orchestration system that is part of Apache Mesos

See also
Maraton (disambiguation)
Marathon Man (disambiguation)

sr:Маратон